L.S. Dunes is an American supergroup fronted by Circa Survive, Saosin and The Sound of Animals Fighting vocalist Anthony Green, with My Chemical Romance guitarist Frank Iero, Coheed and Cambria guitarist Travis Stever, and the rhythm section, bassist Tim Payne, and drummer Tucker Rule from the band Thursday. They made their live debut at Riot Fest 2022 and released their debut album, Past Lives, on November 11, 2022, preceded by the singles "Permanent Rebellion", "2022" and "Bombsquad". The band is set to play their first UK tour in January 2023.

History 
The band formed during the COVID-19 pandemic as vocalist Anthony Green (frontman of Circa Survive, Saosin and the Sound of Animals Fighting) was looking for people to make music with. Originating from rehearsals for Thursday's 2020 holiday livestream, the project started with the working title Dad Bods. The other L.S. Dunes members individually recorded their parts for their debut album, Past Lives, before landing on a vocalist, and Thursday drummer Tucker Rule sent Green instrumental tracks, not initially revealing the group's lineup.

Word of the post-hardcore/emo supergroup first emerged when they appeared on the poster for Riot Fest in May 2022. My Chemical Romance guitarist Frank Iero unveiled the band with guitarist Travis Stever of Coheed and Cambria and Thursday's bassist Tim Payne. Coinciding with their unveiling, L.S. Dunes released their debut single, "Permanent Rebellion", the first single from Past Lives.  It was released via Fantasy Records on August 26 with a music video, and drew praise from several music outlets. The group announced a series of North American tour dates from September 16 to November 30.

L.S. Dunes made their live debut at day one of Riot Fest 2022 at Douglass Park, Chicago, Illinois, on September 16 – where My Chemical Romance also happened to be headlining – playing six songs from Past Lives. After debuting the song at Riot Fest, they released the opening track of Past Lives, "2022", as their second single. The song was released alongside a psychedelic video.

In October 2022, the band announced details of their first UK tour. They are set to play across four cities in January 2023 alongside yet-to-be-announced special guests, in celebration of the release of Past Lives. On October 21, L.S. Dunes released the third single from Past Lives, "Bombsquad", which was also debuted at their Riot Fest set. Released with an accompanying live video, the track came from a poem Green wrote "around the time" of the January 6 United States Capitol attack.

Members 

 Anthony Green – vocals
 Frank Iero – guitar
 Travis Stever – guitar
 Tim Payne – bass guitar
 Tucker Rule – drums

Discography

Studio albums

Singles

References

External links 

 

American supergroups
Musical groups established in 2022
Fantasy Records artists